Prioniodus is an extinct genus of conodonts in the family Balognathidae from the Ordovician.

Prioniodus elegans is from the Ordovician of Baltoscandia.

References

External links 

 
 

Prioniodontida genera
Ordovician conodonts
Paleozoic life of the Northwest Territories